The Helensvale Hogs Rugby Union Football Club is an Australian rugby union football club that competes in the Gold Coast and District Rugby Union competition. The club is based in Brisbane on  Queensland's Gold Coast.

It is currently the number 1 community rugby club on the Gold Coast.

See also

 Sports on the Gold Coast, Queensland
 Rugby union in Queensland
 List of Australian rugby union teams

References

External links

Rugby union teams in Queensland
Rugby clubs established in 1987
1987 establishments in Australia
Rugby union teams on the Gold Coast, Queensland